Dinesh Maheshwari (born 15 May 1958) is a judge of Supreme Court of India. He is a former chief justice of Karnataka High Court. He took oath as a judge of Rajasthan High Court on 2 September 2004. He was transferred to Allahabad High Court and remained senior judge at the Lucknow Bench of Allahabad High Court from 2 March 2015. He took oath as chief justice of the High Court of Meghalaya on 24 February 2016. On transfer to Karnataka, Maheshwari took oath as 30th chief justice of High Court of Karnataka on 12 February 2018. He took oath as judge of Supreme Court of India on 18 January 2019.

Early life and education
He was born on 15 May 1958. His father Late Sh. Ramesh Chandra Maheshwari was an eminent lawyer at Rajasthan High Court, Jodhpur. He completed his graduation in B.Sc. (Hons.) in Physics from Maharaja's College, University of Rajasthan, Jaipur. He graduated in law from Jodhpur University in 1980 and enrolled as an Advocate on March 8, 1981.

Career 
Justice Maheshwari started his practice in the year 1981 at district civil courts of Jodhpur and High Court of Rajasthan at Jodhpur. He practiced mainly on civil & constitutional sides while specialising mainly in civil, revenue, arbitration and company matters. He was lawyer for Revenue and Excise Departments of Government of Rajasthan in Rajasthan High Court, Jodhpur; Urban Improvement Trust, Jodhpur, Municipal Corporation, Jodhpur; Urban Improvement Trust, Udaipur and Rajasthan Tribal Areas Development Co-Operative Federation, Udaipur and various other Co-operative Banks, Oil Companies, Autonomous Bodies, Boards and Corporations.
After a practice and experience of about 23 years as a lawyer he was elevated and appointed a judge of the Rajasthan High Court on 2 September 2004.

Judicial Career 
Justice Maheshwari wrote a majority opinion in Janhit Abhiyan v Union of India, holding that the 103rd Amendment to the Constitution did not violate the basic structure, and upholding reservations for Economically Weaker Sections.

References

1958 births
Living people
21st-century Indian judges
Chief Justices of the Karnataka High Court
Chief Justices of the Meghalaya High Court
Government of Meghalaya
Judges of the Allahabad High Court
Judges of the Rajasthan High Court
Justices of the Supreme Court of India
People from Udaipur